Kamenar (Bulgarian: Каменар) is a village in north-eastern Bulgaria. It is located in the municipality of Varna, Varna Province.

As of March 2015 the village has a population of 2 822.

Honours
Kamenar Point on Davis Coast, Antarctica is named after the village.

Villages in Varna Province